Hattori Racing Enterprises (HRE) is a Japanese-American professional stock car racing team that currently competes in the NASCAR Craftsman Truck Series. Owned by former NASCAR and open-wheel driver Shigeaki Hattori they compete with the No. 16 Toyota Tundra full-time for Tyler Ankrum and the No. 61 Toyota part-time for Christopher Bell in the Truck Series. The team previously competed in the NASCAR Xfinity Series with the No. 61 and No. 80 as well as in the ARCA Menards Series with the No. 01 and No. 1 Toyota Camrys.

History

Xfinity Series

Car No. 61 history
Hattori made his NASCAR Xfinity Series debut with Johnny Sauter at the 2014 DRIVE4COPD 300 at Daytona.  Sauter qualified ninth and finished twenty-eighth, one lap down. After that race, Hattori was quoted as saying "we have decided that we need to focus more on our Nationwide Series program”. Sauter would pilot Hattori's Toyota for two more races, finishing 16th at Charlotte Motor Speedway and 15th at the Subway Firecracker 250 at Daytona.  Starting at Michigan, Ross Chastain piloted the car for four races, turning in a best finish of tenth at Kentucky Speedway. Alex Bowman ran one race for Hattori, at Dover International Speedway.

One weekend after making his Truck debut for HRE, Ross Kenseth made his second Xfinity start and the only Xfinity start of 2015 for HRE. Kenseth started 29th, but he suffered from the limited resources at HRE and finished 33rd, 51 laps down.

The team did not attempt any Xfinity races from 2016, 2017, and 2018, as the team focused on strengthening their Truck Series program and fielding an entry in that series full-time.
On May 30, 2019, it was reported that HRE would field the No. 61 Toyota at the July Daytona race, marking the team's first Xfinity race since 2015. On June 16, 2019, it was announced that the car would driven by Austin Hill, who was to make his Xfinity Series debut; however, a drive line failure prevented Hill from setting a qualifying time and he missed the race.

In August, HRE partnered with MBM Motorsports to renumber the latter's No. 42 to the No. 61 for the Food City 300 at Bristol. Timmy Hill drove the No. 61 to a career-best seventh.

The No. 61 AISIN Group Toyota attempted the race at Indianapolis with Austin Hill and scored a top ten in his first-ever Xfinity start as he finished ninth.

Car No. 61 results

Craftsman Truck Series

Truck No. 16 history

Part Time (2013, 2015-2016)

Hattori made his major-series NASCAR debut at Michigan in 2013 with Brett Moffitt.  Moffitt started fourteenth and finished seventeenth, one lap off the pace.  It would be HRE's only Truck start of the year. The team raced in the Xfinity Series for 2014 before returning to the trucks the next year with a new number. Ross Chastain, who raced for Hattori in 2014, returned to HRE to attempt to qualify at Michigan, but failed to qualify. Ross Kenseth, son of NASCAR Sprint Cup Series champion Matt Kenseth, made his first Truck series start with Hattori at Martinsville Speedway.  Kenseth qualified 25th and finished 17th in the Aisin AW Toyota.  Kenseth failed to qualify for the Truck series finale at Homestead-Miami Speedway.

In early 2016, it was announced that Mayetta, New Jersey's Ryan Truex would drive the No. 81 Toyota for the full season, contingent on sponsorship, according to Truex.  Truex turned in a stellar run at the season-opening NextEra Energy Resources 250, finishing second.  Truex may have won the race if not for NASCAR's "freeze-the-field" rule, which freezes the field when a caution comes out.  Truex had lost support from Parker Kligerman, which allowed Johnny Sauter to win in his first race for GMS Racing.  Truex did lead fourteen laps in the race.  Truex would follow that up with a 20th at Atlanta Motor Speedway and a 12th at Martinsville. Funding fizzled out mid-season, and the team was forced to skip some races in the middle of the season. The team also switched crew chiefs, bringing in Wauters Motorsports owner Richie Wauters midseason. The No. 81 became the No. 16 at the end of 2016.

Ryan Truex (2017)
The team would bring back Ryan Truex to drive full-time in 2017. Truex missed the playoffs in a tiebreaker with Ben Rhodes, but grabbed his first two career poles during the first round of the playoffs. 

Brett Moffitt (2018)
The team would return full-time in 2018, with Brett Moffitt. In Atlanta (2018), Moffitt was able to get the team's first win in the Truck Series. Moffitt proceeded to win a total of six races on the season, including at Chicagoland where the team nearly wasn't able to race due to lack of sponsorship, to secure Hattori's first-ever NASCAR championship. With Moffitt's win at Phoenix in November, HRE's fifth ever in the truck series, and Moffitt's fifth on the season, the team became locked into the Championship 4 Round at Homestead-Miami Speedway. The next weekend, Moffitt held off Noah Gragson to win the team's first-ever championship.

Austin Hill (2019-2021)
On December 6, 2018, it was announced that Moffitt was released from the No. 16 team due to financial issues. The team plans to replace Moffitt with a driver who has sponsorship backing. On January 8, 2019, HRE announced that Austin Hill will drive the No. 16 in the 2019 season. Hill scored his record first win at the season-opening Daytona race. Following 2021, Austin Hill would move to the NASCAR Xfinity Series to drive the No. 21 for Richard Childress Racing. 

Tyler Ankrum (2022-Present)
Tyler Ankrum drove the No. 16 truck in 2022, getting only 8 Top 10s, 0 Top 5s and finished 12th in overall points with no wins. It was announced on January 13, 2023 that he would return to the team for the 2023 season.

Truck No. 16 results

Truck No. 61 history

Beginnings (2021)

For 2021, Max McLaughlin decided to put more focus on his dirt racing efforts and would therefore not run another full season in the East Series. However, he would remain with Hattori as he would return to the Truck Series to run a part-time schedule in a new second truck for the team, marking the first time Hattori has fielded a second team in the Truck Series. Ultimately, he never raced for Hattori.

Chase Purdy (2022)
On November 30, 2021, it was announced that Chase Purdy would drive this brand new No. 61 for 2022. It was announced that Purdy will not return to the team for the 2023 season.

Truck No. 61 results

East Series

Car No. 1 history
In 2018, HRE fielded the No. 1 for Brett Moffitt at Watkins Glen International, where they won.

In 2019, dirt track racer Max McLaughlin signed with HRE to drive the No. 1 Camry with sponsorship from Textron Off Road and Mohawk Northeast Inc. McLaughlin would win at Watkins Glen in the same car Moffitt won with a year earlier.

For 2021, McLaughlin decided to put more focus on his dirt racing efforts and would therefore not run another full season in the East Series.

Car No. 11 history

After competing in East Series for Joe Gibbs Racing in 2010 and Michael Waltrip in 2011, Brett Moffitt joined Hattori Racing and competed in the East Series in 2012  with two wins coming in that season. A crash on the final lap of the 2012 season at Rockingham knocked Brett out of the points lead surrendering the championship to Kyle Larson.
Moffitt drove the full East Series Schedule again in 2013 without a win, but with a runner-up points finish.

ARCA Menards Series

Car No. 01 history
HRE ran four drivers in the No. 01 in 2008, with Sean Caisse making five starts, Justin Marks making two, and Chrissy Wallace and Brent Glastetter making one start each.  Caisse recorded two top-fives, a second and a fifth, and Marks recorded two top-tens, a seventh and an eighth.  Michael Annett made HRE's only start in 2009, a 41st at Daytona after a crash.

Car No. 1 history
McLaughlin returned to the renamed ARCA Menards East Series in 2020 in Hattori's No. 1 car, but with the series having combination races with the East Series, McLaughlin and Hattori also competed in races in this series.

For 2021, McLaughlin decided to put more focus on his dirt racing efforts and would therefore not run another full season in the East Series.

References

External links
 

NASCAR teams
Japanese auto racing teams
American auto racing teams